Anna Johannes (born August 12, 1993) is a Kyrgyzstani-born American Paralympic swimmer.

Biography
Johannes was born in Bishkek, Kyrgyzstan with Amniotic band syndrome. At age 2 she already started jumping into a pool and by the time she turned 6 she joined a local swimming team for able bodied children. At age nine she joined the Olympics but didn't started competing for it till 2011 when she won gold in 100m butterfly, backstroke, breaststroke and freestyle swimming. At the same Parapan American Games she won the same kind of medal for  freestyle and silver one for 50m freestyle. During the 2012 Summer Paralympics she won a bronze medal in 4 × 100 m medley, got 4th in 100 metre breaststroke and 5th in  individual medley. For a time she also held both the American and world records in 100 metre breaststroke and 200 metre individual medley.

References

1993 births
Living people
Sportspeople from Bishkek
Paralympic swimmers of the United States
Paralympic bronze medalists for the United States
Swimmers at the 2012 Summer Paralympics
Medalists at the 2012 Summer Paralympics
American female backstroke swimmers
American female breaststroke swimmers
American female freestyle swimmers
American female medley swimmers
American sportswomen
S9-classified Paralympic swimmers
Paralympic medalists in swimming
Medalists at the World Para Swimming Championships
Medalists at the 2011 Parapan American Games
American adoptees
21st-century American women